Shawn Cable (born February 2, 1980 in Prince George, British Columbia) is a former professional indoor lacrosse player who played for the Calgary Roughnecks, Colorado Mammoth, Anaheim Storm and Portland LumberJax in the National Lacrosse League. He is currently a video analyst for the Roughnecks.

Cable was the first graduate of the Prince George Minor Lacrosse Association to go on to play in the NLL. He won the Ed Bayley Memorial Trophy in 2002 as the Western Lacrosse Association Outstanding Rookie as a member of the North Shore Thunder.

References

1980 births
Living people
Calgary Roughnecks players
Colorado Mammoth players
Anaheim Storm players
Portland LumberJax players
Canadian lacrosse players
Lacrosse forwards
Lacrosse people from British Columbia
Lacrosse transitions
Sportspeople from Prince George, British Columbia